The Cushaw Hydroelectric Project is a 7.5 megawatt (MW) dam and power house facility owned and operated by Virginia Electric Power Company, operating as Dominion Virginia Power. 

The project is located on the James River, a navigable waterway of the United States, in Bedford and Amherst Counties, Virginia. The project occupies federal lands administered by the U.S. Forest Service. Nearby communities include Snowden and Big Island, Virginia. The town of Glasgow, Virginia lies just northwest of the Cushaw Project pool. 

The project was constructed and began generating electric power in 1930 at the site of a former dam constructed in the 1800s also known as Cushaw Dam or Snowden Dam.
The Cushaw Project consists of a 1,550-foot-long, 27-foot-high reinforced concrete dam, with a 1,500-foot-long spillway extending diagonally across the James River. The dam impounds a 138-acre reservoir with a surface elevation of 656 feet mean sea level (msl) at normal operating pool. The project’s powerhouse is integral with the dam and contains five generating units with a total installed capacity of 7,500 kilowatts. Project power is transmitted through a 2.3-kilovolt (kV) underground cable connected to a substation. Dominion operates the project remotely from its Bath County Pumped Storage project. Dominion Energy has sold this power plant (the oldest one in their fleet) in late 2018.

There are no designated recreation areas at the project, but Dominion cooperates with the Virginia Department of Game and Inland Fisheries in maintaining a boat ramp known as Rocky Row Run, which is located on the project impoundment approximately 0.8 mile upstream from the Cushaw dam. In addition, the Appalachian National Scenic Trail Foot Bridge, constructed in 2000 on the pilings of a former railroad bridge, crosses the reservoir about 0.5 mile upstream from the dam. 

A railroad bridge constructed by the Chesapeake & Ohio Railway, now used by successor CSX, crosses the upstream impoundment. US 501 crosses the James River on a girder bridge. Approximately one mile downstream of the dam lies the smaller Bedford Hydropower Project owned and operated by the Town of Bedford, Virginia.

Dominion operates the project in a run-of-river mode whereby flows through the turbines and/or over the spillway crest (elevation 656 feet msl) equal inflow to the project reservoir, as follows. Through use of a level probe equipped with an alarm and a video camera, Dominion ensures that a continuous veil of flow occurs over the 1,500-foot-long spillway. When river flows are between the maximum and minimum hydraulic capacity of the powerhouse [4,150 cubic feet per second (cfs) maximum and 700 cfs minimum], plant operators increase or decrease flows through the turbines to maintain spill over the spillway. When river flow reaches 7,000 cfs, the units are taken off line and all inflow passes over the spillway because the head is insufficient to generate energy due to the increased tailrace elevation. Similarly, when inflow is less than 700 cfs, all inflow passes over the spillway.

References

Dams in Virginia
Gravity dams
James River (Virginia)
Hydroelectric power plants in Virginia